Gadira is a genus of moths of the family Crambidae. This genus is endemic to New Zealand.

Taxonomy 
This species was first described by Francis Walker in 1866 and named Gadira. The type species of this genus is Gadira acerella by original monotypy.

Description
Walker originally described this genus as follows:

Species
The species found in this genus are:
Gadira acerella Walker, 1866
Gadira leucophthalma (Meyrick, 1882)
Gadira petraula (Meyrick, 1882)

References

Crambinae
Crambidae genera
Taxa named by Francis Walker (entomologist)
Endemic fauna of New Zealand
Endemic moths of New Zealand